The Bear of the Baskervilles is a 1916 German silent film directed by Harry Piel.

References

Bibliography

External links

1916 films
Films of the German Empire
Films directed by Harry Piel
German silent feature films
German black-and-white films
1910s German films